The Detroit Mercy Titans women's basketball team is the college basketball team that represents the University of Detroit Mercy in Detroit, Michigan, and competes in NCAA Division I women's basketball as a member of the Horizon League.

History
The Titans began to play in 1977. As of the end of the 2015–16 season, they have an all-time record of 575–557. They lost to Kansas (as a 14 seed) 81–67 in the First Round of the 1997 NCAA Tournament, which remains their only appearance in the Tournament. They played in the North Star Conference from 1984 to 1986. Detroit made an appearance in the WNIT in 2012 and the Women's Basketball Invitational in 2013, winning the title in the latter appearance.

The program went through turmoil in the 2020–21 season. During that season, extensively affected by COVID-19, Detroit Mercy was one of several Division I programs that canceled its season early, but the only one that did so for reasons unrelated to the pandemic. On January 17, 2021, the parents of all 14 players on the roster sent a letter to athletic director Robert Vowels Jr. alleging NCAA rules violations, as well as rampant emotional and physical abuse, by first-year head coach AnnMarie Gilbert. After an internal investigation, Detroit Mercy retained Gilbert, but after all 14 players on the 2020–21 roster left the program, Gilbert resigned on June 15, with assistant LaTanya Collins named interim head coach for the 2021–22 season.

Postseason results

NCAA Division I

AIAW Division I
The Titans made one appearance in the AIAW National Division I basketball tournament, with a combined record of 0–1.

Footnotes

References

External links